Frankston Football Club, nicknamed the Dolphins, is an Australian rules football club based in Frankston, Victoria. The club, formed in 1887, has played in the Victorian Football Association/League almost continuously since 1966.

History
Frankston Football Club was the first Peninsula football club to be founded in 1887. Games were arranged between a group of teams across the Peninsula including Hastings and Mornington.

Peninsula Football Association
Frankston was one of five founding members of the Peninsula Football Association in 1908. In the inaugural season It lost the first Grand Final to Hastings. Frankston were Premiers in 1911, 1919, 1922, 1923, and 1931.

Mornington Peninsula Football League
At the end of the 1933 season the Peninsula Football Association merged with the Peninsula District Football Association to form the Mornington Peninsula Football League.  Frankston were MPFL Premiers in 1937, 1938, 1939, 1941, 1949, 1952 and 1961.

Victorian Football Association
In 1966, Frankston entered the second division of the Victorian Football Association. Its departure from the MPFL was acrimonious, with the MPFL refusing on three occasions over two years to grant the club the necessary clearance. With the strong population growth and natural access to juniors from the strong local league, Frankston had been expected to quickly earn promotion and become a strong Division 1 team, a similar trajectory to that experienced by the Dandenong Football Club; but the fall-out from its bitter departure from the MPFL damaged the club's reputation among junior clubs, local players and businesses on the Mornington Peninsula, and ten years later the club was still in Division 2, having played finals only twice, and was $50,000 in debt.

It was not until 1976 that Frankston saw its first real success. The senior side finished on top of the VFA Second Division ladder but lost both its finals matches, and its reserves side won the premiership. Two years later, in 1978, Frankston won the VFA Second Division premiership, its first and to date only VFA/VFL premiership. Frankston defeated Camberwell 15.13 (103) to 13.11 (89) in front of 12,291 at Toorak Park, and full-forward John Hunter kicked 6 goals in the side 14-point win. As a result, Frankston was promoted to First Division for 1979, and stayed there for the rest of the time that the Association remained in two divisions; its off-field position also improved, with the promotion to Division 1 immediately helping it to secure $30,000 in sponsorship. In 1984 they made the Grand Final but lost by 54 points to Preston.

Victorian Football League
The mid-1990s saw a turbulent period for the VFL with many clubs disbanding and re-organising continuously, yet Frankston remained stable and competitive. Led by former Carlton Football Club premiership player David Rhys-Jones Frankston managed to make the 1996 and 1997 VFL Grand Finals although would lose both matches. In 1999 Robert Mace was again appointed head coach, leading the club until the end of 2002.

In 2009 Frankston appointed former North Melbourne forward Shannon Grant as its senior coach. Grant replaced former Melbourne defender Brett Lovett, who spent six years as coach of the Dolphins. In 2010 Grant was replaced by Simon Goosey, former coach of Mornington Football Club and part-time Essendon Football Club recruiter. In 2015, Frankston was coached by former Box Hill Hawks assistant coach Patrick Hill, but the club finished last and was winless for the first time in its history.

After the VFL merged with the AFL Reserves competition in 2000, Frankston has been unique among all VFL clubs in that it has never been involved in a reserves affiliation with an AFL team.

In the 2010s, the club began to face financial difficulties, which was exacerbated in particular by a turndown in profitability of its pokies licence. It sold off the licence, which by this time was returning a loss, in May 2016, but with debts in excess of $1 million, the club went into voluntary administration late in August 2016. The club's VFL licence was terminated the following month. The club's immediate future was saved when creditors, including the state government gaming administration, agreed to waive more than 90% of the club's debt, and the club came out of administration in late November. It had no playing presence during 2017, but after improving its viability during the year it successfully regained its licence to return to the VFL in 2018. Weak on-field performances accompanied this period of off-field struggle, and the club was winless in 2015 and did not finish outside the bottom two between 2015 and 2019.

Frankston Park
Frankston Park is the home ground of the Dolphins. The ground has a capacity of 5,000 and included a 1,000 seat grandstand. The Frankston Football Club has a fully licensed social club overlooking the oval, capable of seating up to 250 people.

On the morning of 13 February 2008 the Frankston Football Club's historic grandstand, named after stalwart Bryan Mace, was destroyed by fire. This grandstand had been there since the early 1930s and was an icon of the local community. It was originally built for the parade grounds of Australia's first World Scout Jamboree. Damage to the grandstand was estimated at over $1million. The rebuilding of the Grandstand was completed in late 2010.

In 2015, the club expanded its social rooms and function centre, allowing 370 patrons downstairs and a further 220 seated patrons upstairs. Funding was provided by the Victorian State Government, the AFL, AFL Victoria and Frankston City Council.

Honours

VFA/VFL Club Records

Players drafted in AFL who played for Frankston VFL
Marcus Marigliani - Drafted by Essendon in 2009.
Mark Baguley - Drafted by the Essendon in 2011.
Dylan Van Unen - Drafted by Essendon in 2012.
Leigh Osborne - Drafted by Gold Coast Suns in 2012.
Kyle Martin - Drafted by Collingwood in 2012.
Sam Lloyd - Drafted by Richmond in 2013.
Nic Newman - Drafted by Sydney Swans in 2014.

J. J. Liston Trophy Winners
1984 – Peter Geddes
1999 – John Georgiou
2006 – Aaron Edwards

References

External links

 
 Australian Football Club Bio for Frankston Dolphins
 Highlights - 1978 VFA Div 2 GRAND FINAL Frankston v Camberwell

Victorian Football League clubs
Australian rules football clubs in Melbourne
1887 establishments in Australia
Australian rules football clubs established in 1887
Frankston, Victoria
Sport in the City of Frankston